Events from the year 1732 in France

Incumbents
 Monarch – Louis XV

Events

Births

Full date missing
Honoré Fragonard, anatomist (died 1799)
Jean-Honoré Fragonard, painter and printmaker (died 1806)

Deaths

Full date missing
André Charles Boulle, cabinetmaker (born 1642)
Emine Mihrişah Sultan, concubine
Joseph François Salomon, composer (born 1649)

See also

References

1730s in France